Savo Klimovski (Macedonian Cаво Климовски; born 13 June 1947, Skopje) is a Macedonian lawyer and politician. He served as interim President of Macedonia from 19 November to 15 December 1999.

He studied law at Ss. Cyril and Methodius University of Skopje, where he became a dean in 1992. From 1986 to 1991 he was Minister of Education and from 1994 to 2000 had been elected to Parliament from Democratic Alternative list. From 1998 to 2000 Klimovski served as Speaker of the Assembly. As such he was interim President in the end of 1999, when the results of presidential elections were questioned.

References 

1947 births
Macedonian lawyers
Presidents of North Macedonia
Speakers of the Assembly of North Macedonia
Democratic Alternative (North Macedonia) politicians
Education ministers of North Macedonia
Living people